The Amen break is a drum break that has been widely sampled in popular music. It comes from the 1969 track "Amen, Brother" by the soul group the Winstons, released as the B-side of the 1969 single "Color Him Father". The drum break lasts about seven seconds and was performed by Gregory Coleman. 

With the rise of hip hop in the 1980s, the break was used in hits including "Straight Outta Compton" by N.W.A and "Keep It Going Now" by Rob Base and DJ E-Z Rock. In the 1990s, it became a staple of drum and bass and jungle music. It has been used in thousands of tracks of many genres, making it one of the most sampled recordings in history.  

The Winstons received no royalties for the sample. The bandleader, Richard Lewis Spencer, said it was unlikely that Coleman, who died homeless and destitute in 2006, realized the impact he had made on music. Spencer condemned its use as plagiarism, but later said it was flattering.

Recording 
The Winstons were a multiracial soul band from Washington, D.C., who played throughout the southern United States. They were led by Richard Lewis Spencer. In early 1969, the Winstons recorded the single "Color Him Father" in Atlanta. For the B-side, they recorded an instrumental based on the gospel song "Amen" and a guitar riff Curtis Mayfield had played for Spencer. The result was "Amen, Brother", which took 20 minutes to compose. Though "Color Him Father" became a top-10 R&B hit and won a Grammy Award, "Amen Brother", received little notice at the time of release. The Winstons struggled to secure gigs in the South with their multiracial composition and disbanded in 1970.

Drum break 
At about 1 minute and 26 seconds into "Amen, Brother", the other musicians stop playing and drummer Gregory Coleman performs a four-bar drum break. For two bars, he plays the previous beat; in the third, he delays a snare hit; in the fourth, he leaves the first beat empty, following with a syncopated pattern and early crash cymbal.

The drum break was added to pad the length of the track, which had been too short with just the riff. Spencer said he directed the break, but Phil Tolotta, the only other surviving member of the band in 2015, credited it solely to Coleman.

Sampling 
In the 1980s, with the rise of hip hop, DJs began using turntables to loop drum breaks from records, which MCs would rap over. In 1986, "Amen Brother" was included on Ultimate Breaks and Beats, a compilation of old funk and soul tracks with clean drum breaks intended for DJs. 

Salt-N-Pepa's 1986 single "I Desire" had one of the earliest uses of the Amen break. A number of releases in 1988 took it into the mainstream, including "Straight Outta Compton" by N.W.A and "Keep It Going Now" by Rob Base and DJ E-Z Rock. In "King of the Beats" by Mantronix (1988), the Amen break is "chopped up, layered and processed so that the drums became central to the track rather than simply a rhythmic bedding". 

The Amen break was widely sampled in British dance music in the early 1990s, especially in drum and bass and jungle. It has since been used on thousands of tracks, making "Amen, Brother" one of the most widely sampled tracks in history. It has been used in multiple genres, including rock music by acts such as Oasis, and television themes such as Futurama. According to WhoSampled, a user-generated website cataloging samples, the Amen break is the most sampled track in history, appearing in over 5000 tracks as of 2021.

Royalties
The copyright owner of "Amen, Brother", including the Amen break, was the Winstons bandleader, Richard Lewis Spencer. Neither he nor Coleman received royalties for the break, and Spencer was not aware of its use until 1996, when an executive contacted him asking for the master tape. Spencer condemned the sampling as plagiarism, and said in 2011: "[Coleman's] heart and soul went into that drum break. Now these guys copy and paste it and make millions." However, in 2015, he said: "It's not the worst thing that can happen to you. I'm a black man in America and the fact that someone wants to use something I created – that's flattering."

Coleman died homeless and destitute in 2006. Spencer said it was unlikely he was aware of the impact he had made on music. In 2015, a GoFundMe campaign set up for Spencer by British DJs Martyn Webster and Steve Theobald raised £24,000 (US$37,000). Spencer died in 2020.

See also
Breakbeat
Breakcore
Funky Drummer

References

Further reading

External links
 
 The Amen break on freesound.org
 Video of an audio installation about the Amen break's history by Nate Harrison (archive.org mirror, Youtube mirror)
 Amen break on whosampled.com

Sampled drum breaks
Drum and bass
Jungle music
Breakbeat
Wikipedia articles with ASCII art
1969 compositions
Drum patterns
Breakbeat hardcore